Janet Achurch (17 January 1863 – 11 September 1916) was an English stage actress and actor-manager. She made her London debut in 1883.  She played many Shakespearean roles, but is best known as a pioneer of major roles in the works of Ibsen and George Bernard Shaw. Her most notable role was as Nora in the first English production of A Doll's House (1889). She was married to actor Charles Charrington.

Background
Born as Janet Sharp on 17 January 1863 in Chorlton-on-Medlock, Manchester, her mother died during childbirth and she was reared by her father William Prior Sharp, an insurance agent. Her maternal grandparents, James and Mary Achurch, managed the Theatre Royal in Manchester. She became an actress after ending her education in 1881 and joining Sarah Thorne's stock company in Margate.

Career
Janet Achurch's first appearance on stage was in 1883 at the Olympic Theatre in London in the farcical Betsy Baker. From 1883 to her retirement in 1913, she appeared in a wide range of roles, in London, touring England, as well as Australia, New Zealand, India, and Egypt. In 1889 she took over management of the Novelty Theatre in London. That year she played one of her most notable roles as Nora in the English premiere of Ibsen's A Doll's House. This enhanced her own fame as well as Ibsen's standing in England. 

George Bernard Shaw wrote the title role of his play Candida with her in mind and would only allow the play to be performed if Achurch played the title role, which took place in 1897 at Her Majesty's Theatre. In 1889, during her tour with her actor husband Charles Charrington in Egypt, she gave birth to a stillborn child in Cairo, almost dying herself during the birth. The lingering pains increased her addiction to morphine.

Retirement and death
Her last performance was in 1913 as Merete Bery in Wiers-Jenssen's The Witch. Due to exhaustion and illness, she declared her retirement as soon as the production closed. She died of "morphine poisoning" on 11 September 1916, aged 52, at Ventnor, Isle of Wight.

References

Sources

External links
 New York Times review of Janet Achurch's performance in A Doll's House
 findagrave.com
Janet Achurch and Charles Charrington Correspondence. General Collection, Beinecke Rare Book and Manuscript Library, Yale University.

Drug-related deaths in England
English stage actresses
People from Chorlton-on-Medlock
People from Ventnor
1864 births
1916 deaths
Actor-managers
19th-century English actresses
19th-century theatre managers
19th-century English businesswomen
19th-century English businesspeople